Frank Marzoch (born 22 October 1965) is a German former archer. He competed in the men's individual and team events at the 1992 Summer Olympics.

References

External links
 

1965 births
Living people
German male archers
Olympic archers of Germany
Archers at the 1992 Summer Olympics
People from Herne, North Rhine-Westphalia
Sportspeople from Arnsberg (region)